The Shark Is Broken is a play written by Ian Shaw and Joseph Nixon, and directed by Guy Masterson. It is a comedic exploration of the behind-the-scenes drama that took place during the filming of the 1975 film Jaws, the Steven Spielberg film which starred Robert Shaw, Roy Scheider, and Richard Dreyfuss.

Premise 
In 1974, the filming of Jaws is underway. The film's three lead actors - Robert Shaw, Richard Dreyfuss, and Roy Scheider - are stuck together on the Orca boat because Bruce, the mechanical shark used in the film, is broken. Filming has consequently been stalled for several days, turning into weeks. The Shark Is Broken explores the three actors' boredom, arguments, and stories told aboard the boat while filming on the movie has stalled.

The first part of the play sees the three actors arrive on set for the eighth week of filming. They are told that the shark is broken, and start to wait it out aboard the Orca boat. Tensions begin to occur as the three begin to realize how arduous filming the movie has become. The second part begins to establish the hierarchy between the three actors: Shaw, the veteran actor; the young and ambitious Dreyfuss, and Scheider who attempts to be the peacekeeper so that they can all just finish filming the movie. The trio also begin to find ways to pass the time - now in the tenth week of filming the movie. Aided by alcohol, the three begin to share vulnerabilities and stories. Nevertheless, boredom continues to creep in on the actors. The third part takes place at the end of filming Jaws, with the three actors still struggling to understand what the movie is all about. Bored and waiting for filming to wrap, the three engage in rambling, philosophical conversations on the meaning of the movie.

Production history 
The Shark Is Broken premiered on 24 July 2019 at the Rialto Theatre in Brighton, England, for a three-day run. Following this, it transferred to the 2019 Edinburgh Festival Fringe, where it played at the Assembly George Square Studios from 2 August 2019 to 25 August 2019. Ian Shaw portrayed his father, Robert Shaw, with Liam Murray Scott as Richard Dreyfuss and Duncan Henderson as Roy Scheider.

The play was scheduled to premiere in the West End at the Ambassadors Theatre in May 2020, however this was postponed because of the  COVID-19 pandemic. Following the closures, The Shark Is Broken began performances at the Ambassadors Theatre on 9 October 2021. Shaw and Murray Scott reprised their roles, with Demetri Goritsas replacing Henderson as Roy Scheider. Although the show was originally scheduled to close on 15 January 2022, the run was extended until 13 February 2022. On 11 February 2022, lead producer Sonia Friedman announced that the show has recouped and hinted towards future productions.

On 8 June 2022, it was announced that The Shark Is Broken will make its North American premiere at the Royal Alexandra Theatre in Toronto, Ontario. The show began previews on 25 September 2022, with an official opening night on 30 September 2022, before closing on 6 November 2022. Shaw, Goritsas, and Murray all reprised their roles.

Cast and principal roles

Casts

Characters
 Robert Shaw portrayed Quint, a shark hunter and captain of the "Orca" boat.
 Richard Dreyfuss portrayed Matt Hooper, a marine biologist hired by Martin Brody to investigate reported shark incidents in the town.
 Roy Scheider portrayed police chief Martin Brody, who wants to stop shark attacks from happening in the town.

Awards and nominations

External links 
 Official website

References 

2019 plays
British plays
Plays based on actual events
Plays based on real people
West End plays
Jaws (franchise)